The Ykok leader  or M-box is a Mg2+-sensing  RNA structure that controls the expression of Magnesium ion transport proteins in bacteria. It is a distinct structure to the Magnesium responsive RNA element.

The Ykok leader was originally described as a conserved sequence with potential riboswitch function found upstream of the B. subtilis ykoK gene and genes with related functions in other bacteria. Examples of the conserved M-box RNA structure occur upstream of each of the three major families of Mg2+ transporters (CorA, MgtE and MgtA/MgtB) in various bacterial species.

The molecular structure of the M-box example upstream of the B. subtilis ykoK gene includes six bound Mg2+ ions. Biochemical studies indicate that this M-Box RNA compacts in the presence of Mg2+ and other divalent ions. This folding process appears to disrupt an antiterminator structure, and thereby allow a transcription terminator structure to form. As expected from this model, B. subtilis cells repress expression of a downstream reporter gene when grown in the presence of Mg2+. Therefore, the M-box appears to function as a genetic "off" switch that is important for maintaining Mg2+ homeostasis in bacteria.

References

External links
 
 Protein Data Bank: M-Box Structure

Cis-regulatory RNA elements
Riboswitch